Vidal Colmenares was born on February 14, 1952, in Caño de Indio, a neighborhood in Barinas, Venezuela, deep inside the Llanos.

Discography 
1980: Acompañando al arpa (With Pedro Catro. Producer: Rafael Salazar)
1988: A Capanaparo (Producer: José María Marín)
1990: La otra música del llano (With Los Cabestreros. Producer: CONAC)
1997: La Leyenda de Florentino y el Diablo (With Los Cabestreros. Producer: Portuguesa State Government)
2006: Otro llano (Producer: Bob Abreu/Cacao Música)

Sources 
Information from the album Otro llano (2006), by Vidal Colmenares.

See also 
Venezuela
Venezuelan music

1952 births
Living people
People from Barinas (state)
Venezuelan composers
Male composers
Venezuelan folk singers